The IUPUI Jaguars women's basketball team is the women's basketball team that represents Indiana University–Purdue University Indianapolis in Indianapolis, Indiana, United States. The school's team currently competes in the Horizon League.

History
IUPUI began play in 1976. As of the end of the 2019–20 season, they have an all-time record of 577–602. The Jaguars appeared in their first NCAA tournament in 2022 after having won the 2020 Horizon League women's basketball tournament to qualify for the 2020 NCAA tournament, which was cancelled due to the COVID-19 pandemic. The Jaguars also participated in the WNIT in 2013, 2014, 2016, 2017 and 2019, making the Second Round in 2014 and 2016.

Postseason

NAIA Division I
The Jaguars made the NAIA Division I women's basketball tournament two times, with a combined record of 3–2.

NCAA tournament results

References

External links